Lincoln (also Lincoln Mill) is an unincorporated community in Lincoln County, Washington, United States, in the eastern part of the state.  Located on the shores of Franklin D. Roosevelt Lake, it lies 7 mi (11.3 km) northeast of Creston.  Its elevation is 1,394 feet (425 m).  It has a post office with the ZIP code 99147.

References

Unincorporated communities in Lincoln County, Washington
Unincorporated communities in Washington (state)
Washington (state) populated places on the Columbia River